Lou Yun (born June 23, 1964 in Hangzhou, Zhejiang) is a retired Chinese gymnast who competed in the 1984 and 1988 Summer Olympic Games, winning the vault twice.

Lou Yun began gymnastics training at the Hangzhou Sports School for Amateurs, and in the same year he also entered the provincial sports school of Zhejiang. He was selected for the National Gymnastics team in 1977.  Known for his specialty in the vault, he won the 1987 World Championships in that event, in addition to his two gold medals.

External links 
 Gymnast profile
 List of competitive results at Gymn-Forum.net
 Lou Yun(Fx Animation)

1964 births
Living people
Chinese male artistic gymnasts
Gymnasts at the 1984 Summer Olympics
Gymnasts at the 1988 Summer Olympics
Medalists at the World Artistic Gymnastics Championships
Olympic gold medalists for China
Sportspeople from Hangzhou
World champion gymnasts
Olympic medalists in gymnastics
Asian Games medalists in gymnastics
Gymnasts at the 1982 Asian Games
Gymnasts at the 1986 Asian Games
Olympic gymnasts of China
Medalists at the 1988 Summer Olympics
Medalists at the 1984 Summer Olympics
Olympic silver medalists for China
Olympic bronze medalists for China
Asian Games gold medalists for China
Asian Games bronze medalists for China
Medalists at the 1982 Asian Games
Medalists at the 1986 Asian Games
Gymnasts from Zhejiang
Originators of elements in artistic gymnastics
20th-century Chinese people